The Costanzo Family House is a house located in southwest Portland, Oregon, listed on the National Register of Historic Places.

See also
 National Register of Historic Places listings in Southwest Portland, Oregon

References

Further reading

Houses on the National Register of Historic Places in Portland, Oregon
Houses completed in 1912
American Foursquare architecture in Oregon
1912 establishments in Oregon
Southwest Portland, Oregon